L'Île-aux-Marins (literally "The Island of the Sailors"; before 1931 called Île-aux-Chiens, literally "Island of the Dogs") is a small uninhabited island located off the coast of Saint-Pierre and Miquelon.

History
L'Île-aux-Marins was settled in 1604 and once had a population approaching 700.

It was a commune until 1945, when it was annexed by the commune of Saint-Pierre.

Since the 1960s, the town has become a ghost town after the last of the population left for Saint Pierre Island; however, a small number of people live there on a seasonal basis between May to November. Several of the town's buildings are still standing, among them are the church (Eglise Notre-Dame-des-Marins), the Jézéquel house, a number of fisherman's homes, and the Archipélitude Museum located in the town's former school. Several of the buildings were designated with protected status by the French Ministry of Culture in 2011, with the addition of the Jézéquel house in 2014.

The bow section of the wrecked ship Transpacific, which grounded near the islands in 1971, is located on the northern side of the island and is still accessible.

Geography

Two smaller islands, Île aux Vainqueurs and Île aux Pigeons, are located to the northeast of the island.

References

Islands of Saint Pierre and Miquelon
Uninhabited islands of France
Former populated places in North America